The Lion is a mountain in South West Tasmania.  It lies on the North West end of the Frankland Range jutting out toward the East from the range toward the impoundment Lake Pedder. It is the third-highest mountain in the Frankland Range. It is directly South of The Cupola and North of The Citadel.

See also
 Lake Pedder
 Strathgordon, Tasmania
 South West Wilderness, Tasmania

References
 Solitary 4224, Edition 1 2001, Tasmania 1:25000 Series, Tasmap

Lion, The
Lion, The